Mount Gilead may refer to:
 The Mount of Gilead, in the Bible
 Mount Gilead, a pioneer estate now located in Gilead, New South Wales
 Mount Gilead, North Carolina
Mount Gilead Downtown Historic District
 Mount Gilead, Ohio
Mount Gilead High School
Mount Gilead State Park
Mount Gilead-Mansfield Road
Mount Gilead-Mount Vernon Road
 Mount Gilead, Tennessee
 Mount Gilead, Virginia
 Mount Gilead Estate, a retirement community near Campbelltown, South Australia

See also
Gilead (disambiguation)